Apotoforma viridans is a species of moth of the family Tortricidae. It is found in Brazil (Rondonia).

References

Moths described in 2003
Tortricini
Moths of South America